Johnstone Olindi (born 4 November 1999) is a Kenyan rugby sevens player. He competed in the men's tournament at the 2020 Summer Olympics. He also featured for Kenya at the 2022 Rugby World Cup Sevens in Cape Town.

References

External links
 

1999 births
Living people
Male rugby sevens players
Olympic rugby sevens players of Kenya
Rugby sevens players at the 2020 Summer Olympics
Sportspeople from Nairobi
Rugby sevens players at the 2022 Commonwealth Games